Leng Mei, was a Chinese painter. He was a native of Jiaozhou, Shandong province, active 1677-1742 (his specific years of birth and death are not known). His courtesy name was Jichen, and sobriquet Jinmen Waishi, or Jinmen Shushi. He was Jiao Bingzhen's student. Leng's specialty was painting human figures, particularly court ladies.

Works

References

17th-century Chinese painters
18th-century Chinese painters
Artists from Qingdao
Qing dynasty painters
Painters from Shandong
Year of birth unknown
Year of death unknown